Laura Ross-Paul (born 1950) is a contemporary painter of oil and wax in the Pacific Northwest of the United States.  In 2010 The Oregonian OregonLive.com referred to her as a "venerable [figure] from Portland's long established vanguard" of art.

Personal life 
Laura Ross-Paul was born in Portland, Oregon in 1950.  When she was 17 both of her parents and two siblings were killed in a car crash with a drunk driver, leaving Laura and a younger sister behind.

In 1968, Ross-Paul worked as a political cartoonist and illustrator for The Scab Sheet 10 cents for the Truth, a Vietnam-era underground anti-war newspaper in Corvallis, Oregon.  In 1974, Ross-Paul received her Bachelor of Fine Arts in Painting from Fort Wright College. She went on to obtain her Master of Fine Arts in Painting and her B.S. from Portland State University.

She married Alex Paul in 1970. In 2014 Ross-Paul, her husband Alex, and Dr. Peter Littrup published They're Mine and I'm Keeping Them through the self-publishing service CreateSpace, an account of her experience with breast cancer and seeking successful cryoablation treatment for it.  Ross-Paul illustrated the book.

Career 
Ross-Paul frequently uses the landscape of the Pacific Northwest as a background for her paintings. Her style uses the inherent qualities of the medium and lets paint bleed across her composition, frequently using a resin compound to blur the colors together to achieve a soft look. Geometric shapes such as orbs are a common reoccurring motif in her paintings. Her 2002 collection is a strong example of this.

Awards and accolades 
 2008 - Bonnie Bronson Award
 1998 - Commissioned to create the Governor's Arts Award, Oregon Arts Commission
 1997 - Juror's Award, Oregon Biennial, Portland Art Museum
 1997 - Juror's Award, Pacific, Northwest Annual, Bellevue Art Museum
 1996 - Artist Fellowship, Oregon Arts Commission, Oregon Symphony, Cover Art, Fall Concert Series, Commissioned for large works for Claremont Hotel
 1995 - Awarded Metropolitan Arts Commission "Visual Chronicles", featured in Lois Allan's "Contemporary Northwest Art", TriMet Westside Light Rail, Large Scale Mural, Zoo Station. Administered by the Metropolitan Arts Commission. Portland OR
 1980 - Individual Artist Fellowship Recipient, Oregon Arts Commission

Museum collections 
 Bakersfield Museum of Art, Bakersfield, CA
 Hallie Ford Museum of Art, Salem, OR
 Portland Art Museum, Portland, OR

References

External links 
 Joanne Artman Gallery, Laguna Beach
 Laura Ross-Paul
 KeepingThem.com, the web site for her book

Artists from Portland, Oregon
Living people
1950 births
Portland State University alumni